This is a list of animal breeds originating in Slovakia.

Slovak chicken breeds
 Oravak hen

Slovak goose breeds
 Slovak White Goose (Slovenská biela hus)
 Suchovy Goose (Suchovská hus)

Slovak pigeon breeds
 Komorner Tumbler (Komárňanský kotrmeliak)
 Košice Tumbler (Košický kotrmeliak)
 Košice Highflier (Košický letún)
 Piestany Giant Pigeon (Piešťanský obor)
 Slovak Pouter (Slovenský hrvoliak)
 Slovak Highflier (Slovenský letún)

Slovak rabbit breeds
 Holic Rabbit (Holíčsky modrý králik)
 Liptov Baldspotted Rabbit (Liptovský lysko)
 Nitra Rabbit (Nitriansky králik)
 Slovak Greyblue Rex (Slovenský sivomodrý rex)
 Zemplin Rabbit (Zemplínsky pastelový králik)
 Zobor Rabbit (Zoborský králik)

Slova cattle breads
 Slovak Spotted cattle (Slovenský strakatý dobytok)
 Slovak Pinzgau cattle (Slovenský pinzgauský dobytok)

Slovak sheep breeds
 Domestic Tsigai (Cigája)
 Slovak merino sheep (Slovenská merinka)
 Native Wallachian sheep (Pôvodná valaška)
 Improved Wallachian sheep  (Zošľachtená valaška)

Slovak goat breeds
 White Shorthaired goat (Biela bezrohá krátkosrstá koza)
 Brown Shorthaired goat (Hnedá bezrohá krátkosrstá koza)

Slovak horse breeds
 Hucul pony (Hucul, Huculský kôň)
 Slovak warm-blooded horse (Slovenský teplokrvník)
 Slovak sport pony (Slovenský športový pony)

Slovak dog breeds

 Slovak Cuvac (Slovenský čuvač)

 Slovenský kopov

 Slovakian Rough-haired Pointer (Slovenský hrubosrstý stavač)

 Czechoslovakian Wolfdog  (Československý vlčiak)

References 
 Traditional animal breeds reared in Slovakia
 Slovak Association of Animal Breeders